Research Plot 2, located near Centennial Ave. and 18th St. N. on the North Dakota State University campus in Fargo, North Dakota.  The plot was established in 1882 on land that was broken from native prairie sod.  It has been sown to spring wheat continuously since that date.  The plot was listed on the National Register of Historic Places in 1991 as Agricultural Research Site, but has historically been known as Research Plot 2.

The plot is known as the oldest continuously cultivated wheat field site used in research.  It is valuable for its long history because its soil is then particularly "ripe" with soil pathogens relevant for testing new varieties of wheat.

See also
Research Plot 30, also NRHP-listed, nearby, famous as site of flax research
Beatrice Willard Alpine Tundra Research Plots, Estes Park, Colorado, NRHP-listed

References

Farms on the National Register of Historic Places in North Dakota
1882 establishments in Dakota Territory
Geography of Cass County, North Dakota
North Dakota State University
National Register of Historic Places in Cass County, North Dakota
Wheat
History of agriculture in the United States
Phytopathology